Kim Stringfellow (born 1963) is an American artist, educator, and photographer based out of Joshua Tree, California. She is an associate professor at the San Diego State School of Art, Design, and Art History and received her MFA in Art and Technology from the School of the Art Institute of Chicago. Stringfellow is notable as an artist for her transmedia documentaries of landscape and the economic effects of environmental issues on humans and habitat. Stringfellow's photographic and multimedia projects engage human/landscape interactions and explore the interrelation of the global and the local.

Biography 
Stringfellow received her Bachelor of Fine Arts from the Academy of Art College in San Francisco in 1988. In the year 2000, Stringfellow received her MFA from the School of the Art Institute of Chicago. She became an assistant professor at San Diego State's School of Art, Design, and Art History in 2001 where she was promoted in 2018 to associate professor with tenure at San Diego State University. She has been an invited artist and speaker on numerous occasions, including the art department of University of Nevada Las Vegas' visiting lecturer series in 2009.

Prior to achieving her MFA and tenured positions, a collection of her photographs entitled Photographic Constructions, exhibited at the Morphos Gallery in San Francisco in 1994. The collection explored personal narratives and addressed spirituality and feminist issues through art history. Among her earliest environmentally-based endeavors include Stringfellow's taking part in Salmoncity.net, a web-based piece of art commissioned by the Seattle Arts Commission in response to the ESA listing of the Puget Sound Chinook salmon as regionally threatened.

Works

The Charmed Horizon 
"The Charmed Horizon" site was selected as Best Art-Related Site at the 2nd Annual South by Southwest Interactive Web Competitiond in 2019 and was included in the Seventh New York Digital Salon at the School of Visual Arts. The project was inspired by excerpts from the 19th century French writer, Lautreamont's Les Chants de Maldoror. The project's purpose was to examine human desire and other emotive issues.

The Mojave Project 

The Mojave Project is a transmedia piece that explores the physical and cultural landscape of the Mojave Desert. This piece began in 2013 and exhibited in Fall of 2018. This project features themes such as Desert as Wasteland, Geological Time vs. Human Time, Sacrifice and Exploitation, Danger and Consequence, Space and Perception, Mobility and Movement, Desert as Staging ground and Transportation and Reinvention.The Mojave Project was awarded a Curatorial Projects Fellowship from The Andy Warhol Foundation for the Visual Arts in 2017.

Invisible 5

Invisible-5 is a project created by Stringfellow, Amy Balkin, and Tim Halbur which uses the methods of a self-guided art gallery tour to provide a self-guided tour of the portion of Interstate 5 between San Francisco and Los Angeles.[6] Balkin and Stringfellow launched it in 2006.[7] On October 13 of that year, NPR's Bay Area affiliate KQED featured invisible-5 on its show The California Report.[8] Its goal is make people who "create a romantic California" by "mentally blotting out" the parts which don't conform to that ideal take the time to see the places they usually ignore.[9]

Jackrabbit Homestead

A book, downloadable audio tour and website comprise Stringfellow's multimedia project Jackrabbit Homestead.[10] The project examines the legacy of the Small Tract Act of 1938 in the Morongo Basin. It was made possible by a grant from the California Council for the Humanities, and was featured in the Desert Sun on August 1, 2009. The book, Jackrabbit Homestead: Tracing the Small Tract Act in the Southern California Landscape, 1938-2008, was published in December 2009 by the Center for American Places. It includes photography and writing by Stringfellow as well as historical illustration. The website includes a brief description of the project, news about the project, and multimedia including Stringfellow's photography and the audio tour.

Greetings from the Salton Sea

Greetings from the Salton Sea''' is a project created by Stringfellow, including photography by her and documenting the history of the Salton Sea, California's largest inland body of water. It consists of a book, exhibition, and website.[4] The artist and the book were both featured on KPBS to commemorate the sea's centennial.[5] The book, Folly and Intervention in the Southern California Landscape, 1905-2005, was first published in 2005 by the Center for American Places. The book's publication was in part funded by a loan from the Graham Foundation for Advanced Studies in the Fine Arts. The website features photographs, a history of Salton Sea, an artist statement, a list of the artist's resources, and an interactive map of the area around the Salton Sea. It calls attention to the issue of whether or not it is artificial and suggests possible solutions to the ecological and socioeconomic issues surrounding Salton Sea.

Safe as Mothers MilkSafe as Mother's Milk is a multimedia project that examines the history of the Hanford Nuclear Reservation. It was commissioned by Adrian Van Egmond for the Cornish College of the Arts Art + Activism Visiting Artist series in 2002.[3] Stringfellow explores the Hanford and its history, calling attention to events of unplanned and planned releases of radioactive material in the atmosphere while producing plutonium for the U.S. nuclear arsenal. This project serves as an exploration of the area in hopes to educate Hanford's uninformed public on the releasing of radioactive materials during the Cold War era.

There It Is – Take It!There It Is – Take It! is self-guided audio tour that takes the listener through Owens Valley California launched October 14, 2012. This project explores political social and environmental contexts of Los Angeles Aqueduct system and relates to its history, present and future. This piece features a combination of audio, interviews and music that take the listener through a guided tour along the landscape and builds a relationship between Los Angeles and the Owens Valley.

BooksGreetings from the Salton Sea: Folly and Intervention in the Southern California Landscape, 1905–2005. Santa Fe, NM: Center for American Places, 2005. .
Second edition. Chicago: The Center for American Places at Columbia College Chicago, 2011. .Jackrabbit Homestead: Tracing the Small Tract Act in the Southern California Landscape, 1938–2008. Chicago: Center for American places at Columbia College, 2009. .

WebsitesJackrabbit Homesteadinvisible-5Safe as Mother's MilkSalmoncity.net''

Achievements

Grants 
2004: Graham Foundation for Advanced Studies in the Fine Arts grant for Greetings from the Salton Sea in 2p00
2004: Creative Work Fund production grant for the Invisible-5 with Amy Balkin, and Tim Halbur with Green Action for Health and Environmental Justice, and Pond (fiscal sponsor)
2007: Graham Foundation for Advanced Studies in the Fine Arts grant from Jackrabbit Homestead
2008: California Council for the Humanities California Story Fund production grant for Jackrabbit Homestead
2010: Center for Cultural Innovation (CCI) “Investing in Artists” equipment grant
2011: California Council for the Humanities California Stories production grant for There It Is-Take It!
2014: California Humanities California Documentary Project Research & Development Grant for New Media for The Mojave Project
2015: California Humanities California Documentary Project Production Grant for New Media for The Mojave Project

Awards 
2012: Theo Westenberger Award for Artistic Excellence, Autry National Center, Los Angeles, CA

Fellowships 
2015: Guggenheim Fellowship from the John Simon Guggenheim Memorial Foundation
2016: Andy Warhol Foundation for the Visual Arts Curatorial Fellowship

Exhibits

References

External links 

 Kim Stringfellow Photographs and Papers. Yale Collection of Western Americana, Beinecke Rare Book and Manuscript Library.

1963 births
Living people
Academy of Art University alumni
School of the Art Institute of Chicago alumni
American women photographers
American educators
21st-century American women